The Duchess of Normandy was the wife of the Duke of Normandy.

Duchess of Normandy

First Creation

House of Normandy, 911–1135

House of Blois, 1135–1154

House of Plantagenet, 1144–1204

Second Creation

House of Valois, 1332–1350

Third Creation

House of Valois, 1355–1364 
{| style="width:95%;" class="wikitable"
|-
! style="width:8%;"| Picture
! style="width:10%;"| Name 
! style="width:9%;"| Father
! style="width:10%;"| Birth
! style="width:9%;"| Marriage
! style="width:9%;"| Became Duchess
! style="width:9%;"| Ceased to be Duchess
! style="width:9%;"| Death
! style="width:7%;"| Spouse
|-
|align=center|  
|align=center| Joan of Bourbon<ref name="Dauphine">Also Dauphine of France and of Viennois, Countess of Valentinois and of Diois.</ref>   
| style="text-align:center;"| Peter I, Duke of Bourbon(Bourbon)
| style="text-align:center;"| 3 February 1338 
| style="text-align:center;"| 8 April 1350 
| style="text-align:center;"| 7 December 1355husband's accession
| style="text-align:center;"| 8 April 1364became Queen consort of France
| style="text-align:center;"| 6 February 1378
| style="text-align:center;"| Charles I(Charles Vof France)
|}

 Fourth Creation 
 House of Valois, 1465–1472 None Fifth Creation 
 House of Bourbon, 1785–1789 None'''

Notes

 
Consorts
Viking Age in France
Lists of French nobility
Lists of duchesses
Norman titles of nobility